Ayı Sözlük ("Bear Dictionary") is an LGBTQ collaborative dictionary founded by İlker Bozkurt on 14 August 2011. The majority of the contributors are LGBTQ individuals. The purpose of establishing the dictionary is to make the voice of LGBTQ individuals heard as a part of the society, to defend LGBTQ rights, to enable them to write freely, to support young LGBTI individuals in their acceptance processes, to make them feel that they are not alone and wrong, and to fight against transphobia, homophobia, and hate crimes. Sözlük yazar kadrosu içinde gönüllü avukatlar hukuk danışmanlığı yaparken sözlük yazarları arasında gönüllü psikologlar da bulunmaktadır. Over time, it has become a community that organizes events and conducts charity projects. Since July 2014, they have been accepted as an LGBTQ community by ILGA.

The LGBTQ culture and life magazine Homojen, prepared by Ayı Sözlük and its founder and independent activist İlker Bozkurt, was first published on 5 September 2015. The reason for the journal's name being Homojen (homogeneous) is "to emphasize that every individual living in society has the right to live without discrimination without any reason". Homojen, which is the first culture and lifestyle magazine featuring LGBT content in Turkey, began to be published in print on 3 September 2016.

A voluntary team of doctors, psychologists, psychology counselors, education counselors, social workers, sociologists, and lawyers are among the authors of Ayı Sözlük, providing voluntary and free support to individuals who need support under the patronage of ASDİ (Ayı Sözlük LGBTQ + Psycho-Social Support Initiative).

Statistics 

The dictionary, which has reached 2,466 registered users, has a total of 313,003 different definitions under 55,194 titles as of 2015. In November 2012, it ranked seventh among the collaborative dictionaries in Turkey. In August 2014, it ranked eighth on the same list in Turkey. In 2015, it appeared again on the list of popular collaborative dictionaries and ranked 10th and 9th in June and July respectively. Ayı Sözlük is the first LGBTQ dictionary to rank among the top 10 collaborative dictionaries in Turkey. In April 2016, it had 4211 unique monthly visitors.

Other platforms 

On the dictionary's mobile application, features such as "link abbreviation apparatus" for shortening long links, "zirvetör" in which dictionary activities are created, and "notices" posted by users are included. In addition, the dictionary has an LGBTQ Culture, Art and Life magazine called Homojen, an LGBTQ themed film, series, documentary, and clip promotion portal called Ayılarock, and a psycho-social support initiative that supports LGBTQ+ individuals called ASDİ.

Activities 

All dictionary authors have the right to organize meetings called "zirve" summits in which other authors may participate. Since its inception, 97 events have been held as of 2015.

References

External links 

 Official website – Ayı Sözlük
 Homojen Dergi – LGBTQ culture and life magazine

Internet properties established in 2011
Turkish websites
LGBT organizations in Turkey